"The Name Game" is a song co-written and performed by Shirley Ellis as a rhyming game that creates variations on a person's name. She explains through speaking and singing how to play the game. The first verse is done using Ellis's first name; the other names used in the original version of the song are Lincoln, Arnold, Tony, Billy, Marsha, and Nick.

History
Written by American singer Shirley Ellis (who based the song on a game she played as a child) and Lincoln Chase, Ellis's recording, produced by Charles Calello, was released in late 1964 as "The Name Game". The record scored third on the Billboard Hot 100, and fourth on the magazine's R&B charts during 1965. The record was re-released in 1966 and again in 1973. A R&B singer for 10 years before that success, Ellis was also successful with "The Clapping Song (Clap Pat Clap Slap)" (#8 pop and #16 R&B), and "The Nitty Gritty" (#8 on the Hot 100 and #4 on the Cash Box R&B chart). Ellis performed on then-major television programs, including Hullabaloo, American Bandstand and The Merv Griffin Show.  It later became a popular children's singalong.

Rules

Using the name Katie as an example, the song follows this pattern:

Katie, Katie, bo-batie,
Bonana-fanna fo-fatie
Fee fi mo-matie
Katie!

A verse can be created for any name with stress on the first syllable, with X as the name and Y as the name without the first consonant sound (if it begins with a consonant), as follows:

(X), (X), bo-b (Y)
Bonana-fanna fo-f (Y)
Fee fi mo-m (Y)
(X)!

If the name starts with a b, f, or m, that sound simply is not repeated. For example: Billy becomes "Billy Billy bo-illy"; Fred becomes "bonana fanna fo-red"; Marsha becomes "fee fi mo-arsha"

The song as originally performed gives no indication of what to do with names where the stress falls on a syllable after the first, like Anita or Antoinette; however, the cover version on the workout video Sweatin' to the Oldies 3 (vocals by Donna Miller) suggests that the first syllable should be dropped after the name is first said; the name Madonna is sung as "Madonna-donna-bo-bonna," etc.

See also
1964 in music
Nursery rhyme
Swinging the Alphabet

References

1964 singles
1965 singles
Laura Branigan songs
Songs written by Lincoln Chase
Patter songs
1964 songs
Stacy Lattisaw songs
Novelty songs